Sigma Sports is a Canadian youth soccer development academy and player management company based in Mississauga, Ontario. They also operate a senior academy soccer team that currently competes in League1 Ontario, as Sigma FC. Over 140 Sigma players have gone on to play NCAA or U Sports soccer on scholarships.

History
Sigma was formed in 2005 by Constantine and Bobby Smyrniotis as a private academy aimed to develop young Canadian soccer players. Over the years Sigma have sent players from their academy to the NCAA and to trials overseas.

When League1 Ontario was formed in early 2014, Sigma announced they would be entering their senior academy team to compete as part of inaugural season. They were one of the three Ontario Soccer Association Recognized Non-Club Academies permitted to enter a team in the league, along with ANB Futbol and Master's FA. The Mississauga-based League1 Ontario teams - Sigma FC and North Mississauga SC (and formerly the now-Brampton-based ProStars FC) - compete annually for the Credit River Cup, awarded by the Sauga City Collective supporters group, with the team's matches against each other during the L1O deciding the victor.

Sigma made news in January 2015 when academy player Cyle Larin was drafted first overall by Major League Soccer club Orlando City at the 2015 MLS SuperDraft. This was the first time a Canadian went first overall in an MLS draft.

On October 1, 2018, Sigma co-founder Bobby Smyrniotis was named head coach and technical director of Canadian Premier League club Forge FC. Bobby had served as technical director and first team head coach of Sigma from 2005 to 2018. 16 members of Forge's 2019 roster had played for Sigma in the past.

Seasons

Notable players
The following players have either played at the professional or international level, either before or after playing for the League1 Ontario team:

References

External links
 

Soccer clubs in Ontario
League1 Ontario teams
Sport in Mississauga
2005 establishments in Ontario